12/3 may refer to:
December 3 (month-day date notation)
March 12 (day-month date notation)
12 shillings and 3 pence in UK predecimal currency

See also
 123 (disambiguation)
 3/12 (disambiguation)